Paige Doherty was a 15-year-old student from Clydebank, Scotland who was murdered on 19 March 2016 by 32 year-old John Leathem in his deli.

Background
Paige had stayed at her friend’s house on the night of 18 March. On the 19th, at around 8:21am, she went to John Leathem's delicatessen.

Murder investigation
Her body was found on the roadside near Glasgow's Great Western Road two days after she disappeared. Doherty had been stabbed in the head and neck and suffered more than 250 wounds, though her mother, Pamela Munro, claimed that there were more than 500 wounds.  The last sighting of her was on CCTV at a deli shop in Clydebank, owned by John Leathem, who later admitted to murdering Paige Doherty. Pamela set up the charity, Paige's Promise, in her daughter's name to teach children self defense, as well as support families whose children have been victims of murder.

Trial
John Leathem claimed that Paige threatened to tell people that he had "touched her" inappropriately, if he refused to give her a job, because she was underage.
The main evidence used in the trial was CCTV footage of Leathem closing the Deli, running to the shop next door, and then returning with the deli remaining closed for about an hour. The footage then shows him putting a full bin bag in his trunk. The bag was confirmed to contain the body of Paige and when the owner of the shop he visited was questioned, it was confirmed that Leathem had purchased gloves, bleach, and the bin bag.

Sentencing
On 12 October 2016, 7 months after Doherty's murder, Leathem was sentenced at the High Court in Glasgow, where judge Lady Rae set a minimum time of 27 years in jail before becoming eligible to apply for parole. However in February 2017, following an appeal by Leathem, the minimum term was reduced to 23 years.

See also
 List of solved missing person cases

References

External links
 Paige's Promise charity
 Scottish Courts document on John Leathem's appeal

2010s missing person cases
2016 in Scotland
2016 murders in the United Kingdom
Deaths by stabbing in Scotland
Clydebank
Female murder victims
Formerly missing people
Incidents of violence against girls
March 2016 crimes in Europe
March 2016 events in the United Kingdom
Missing person cases in Scotland
Murder in Glasgow
Violence against women in Scotland